Flisa is a river in Innlandet county, Norway. The river flows through the municipalities of Åsnes and Våler (although it has its originas in Elverum and Sweden). The river Flisa starts at the confluence of the rivers Ulvåa and Holåa on the border of Våler and Åsnes. It then flows to the south and west before joining the river Glomma just south of the village of Flisa. Some of the side rivers that join the Flisa are Vermundelv (from the lake Vermunden) and Kynna.

See also
List of rivers in Norway

References

Åsnes
Våler, Innlandet
Elverum
Rivers of Innlandet